John Murphy Willems (December 24, 1901 – September 14, 1976) was an American equestrian. He competed in two events at the 1936 Summer Olympics. He was also an officer in the United States Army and served during World War II, eventually attaining the rank of brigadier general. From 1955 to 1956 he commanded the 3rd Armored Division.

Biography
John Willems was born in Fort Leavenworth, Kansas on December 24, 1901. He graduated from the United States Military Academy at West Point in 1925.

He died in San Diego on September 14, 1976, and was buried at Fort Rosecrans National Cemetery.

References

External links
 

1901 births
1976 deaths
American male equestrians
Olympic equestrians of the United States
Equestrians at the 1936 Summer Olympics
People from Fort Leavenworth, Kansas
United States Army generals
United States Army generals of World War II
Burials at Fort Rosecrans National Cemetery
United States Military Academy alumni